Lourdes Mount College of Engineering & Technology  is a 
self-financing engineering college set up by the Chellammal Educational Trust in 2013 and located close to Marthandam on a scenic, peaceful and green environment near the border between Kerala and Tamil Nadu. The college is approved by All India Council of Technical Education (AICTE), New Delhi and affiliated to Anna University, Chennai.

Affiliation
The college is affiliated to the Anna University, Chennai and is approved by the All India Council for Technical Education and Government of Tamil Nadu.

Academic programs
Lourdes Mount College of Engineering & Technology offers following Under-Graduate Programs.

Under Graduate Degree Programs
 B.E. - Civil Engineering
 B.E. - Mechanical Engineering
 B.E. - Electrical & Electronics Engineering
 B.E. - Electronics & Communication Engineering
 B.E. - Computer Science & Engineering

Location

It is located midway between Marthandam and Karungal in Kanyakumari District, Tamil Nadu.

Mission
To provide every student with a favorable environment and world class education for producing technically competent and vibrant engineering professionals committed to technological, social and economic development of our country.

Gallery

About the Trust
Chellammal Educational Trust is headquartered in Chennai and has trustees owning companies and has business partnership with MNCs. The trust is promoting this college to provide employable Technical education and provide placement opportunities for the welfare of the student community.

Trust Office 
No. 26, Dr. Ambedkar Road, 
Kodambakkam, 
Chennai – 600 024, Tamil Nadu

References

 

Engineering colleges in Tamil Nadu
Colleges affiliated to Anna University
Universities and colleges in Kanyakumari district
Educational institutions established in 2013
2013 establishments in Tamil Nadu